Harold Raymond Edwards  (10 January 1927 – 26 June 2012) was an Australian politician, economist and academic.

Early life and education
Born in Drummoyne, Sydney, Edwards was educated at Abbotsford Public School until his family moved to Temora, due to the Sydney smog aggravating his sister's asthma. In Temora, Edwards joined the Air Corps and gained his private pilot's licence. When he finished his schooling, he returned to Sydney to attend the University of Sydney, from which he graduated with a Bachelor of Arts, majoring in economics.

Academic career
Edwards received his PhD from Nuffield College, Oxford—his doctoral thesis, Competition and Monopoly in the British Soap Industry, was published as a book in 1962. He was subsequently Professor of Economic Theory at the University of Sydney from 1962 to 1965. In 1966 he became Professor of Economics at Macquarie University, a position he held until 1972. Among his students was John Hewson.

Political career
In 1972, Tom Hughes, the Liberal member for the very safe Australian House of Representatives seat of Berowra was preselected for the seat, but subsequently retired after being removed from the ministry. Edwards nominated for preselection, which he won against a large field of 24 candidates including future Prime Minister John Howard. He was elected at the 1972 federal election, and held the seat until his retirement in 1993. Edwards was the only person to be on the Coalition front bench during the Labor governments of both Gough Whitlam and Bob Hawke, without holding ministerial position during the intervening Liberal government of Malcolm Fraser.

Edwards was made a Member of the Order of Australia in 2005.

References

1927 births
2012 deaths
Australian economists
Liberal Party of Australia members of the Parliament of Australia
Members of the Australian House of Representatives for Berowra
Members of the Australian House of Representatives
Members of the Order of Australia
Alumni of Nuffield College, Oxford
Academic staff of the University of Sydney
20th-century Australian politicians